Pick Pocket is a 1989 Indian Tamil-language film directed by G. M. Kumar, starring Sathyaraj and Radha. The film was released on 23 June 1989.

Plot 

Rangaraj and Radha are both pickpockets, fall in love and get married. With the help of Rajalakshmi, who also has a passion for art, Rangaraj tries to create a few forged education certificates and applies for the post of police officer. He even succeeds in it.

Cast 
Sathyaraj as Rangaraj (a) Sathyaraj
Radha as Rajalakshmi
S. S. Chandran
Livingston
Silk Smitha
T. Kumar
Anjana

Production 
According to Kumar, the film was "chopped mercilessly" by the censor board.

Soundtrack 
Soundtrack was composed by Ilaiyaraaja.

Reception 
P. S. S. of Kalki wrote .

References

External links 
 

1980s Tamil-language films
1989 films
Censored films
Films directed by G. M. Kumar
Films scored by Ilaiyaraaja
Films shot in Mysore